The Old Borges Ranch is a  Historic District containing four contributing buildings, in the Diablo Foothills of the northern Diablo Range, within the  Walnut Creek Open Space in Contra Costa County, California.

The former ranch of early Walnut Creek pioneer Frank Borges is the home base for the surrounding Shell Ridge Open Space park's activities.  It is located at 1035 Castle Rock Road, south of Walnut Creek.  The Borges Ranch houses as a ranger station, maintenance facility, and ranger residence. The park and ranch are owned and operated by the City of Walnut Creek.

History
In 1899 early Walnut Creek pioneer Frank Borges purchased  for a cattle ranch and home for his family.  The former ranch complex includes a blacksmith shop, numerous outbuildings, farm equipment displays, and a barn.

Old Borges Ranchhouse and Visitor Center

The Borges family home was  built in 1901. It is a five-room redwood structure, that withstood five generations of Borgeses. It was restored as a historic house museum, with period furnishings and artifacts, including a silver and black Stewart stove, and historical displays of the early 1900s in the area. It serves as the Old Borges Ranchhouse and Visitor Center for the Walnut Creek Open Space parks.

See also

 National Register of Historic Places listings in Contra Costa County, California
  — pre-statehood Spanish & Mexican land grant ranches.

References

External links

 Old Borges Ranch website
 Shell Ridge Open Space webpage 
 Open Space Trail Map Trail map — northern section with Borges Ranch.

Ranches in California
Parks in Contra Costa County, California
Diablo Range
Historic house museums in California
Museums in Contra Costa County, California
Open-air museums in California
Houses completed in 1901
Houses in Contra Costa County, California
Historic districts on the National Register of Historic Places in California
National Register of Historic Places in Contra Costa County, California
Ranches on the National Register of Historic Places in California
History of Contra Costa County, California
Walnut Creek, California
Blacksmith shops